Honky Tonk Masquerade is the second album by country singer-songwriter Joe Ely, released in 1978.

Critical acclaim 
Ely's second album has been highly regarded by critics around the world.  It was included in the 2005 book, 1001 Albums You Must Hear Before You Die. Writer Steve Pond places the album at number 40 on Rolling Stone's list of "50 Essential Albums of the 70s", calling it "the decade's most sure-footed country-rock collaboration".  Pond places the album in the same class as such 1970s "country landmarks" as Guy Clark's Old No. 1, Willie Nelson's Red Headed Stranger, and Terry Allen's Lubbock (On Everything).  In addition, New Zealand critic Fred Muller places the album on his list of the top ten "best albums of the rock era".

LP track listing 
All songs by Joe Ely; except as indicated.

Side one
 "Cornbread Moon" – 3:29 
 "Because of the Wind" – 4:02 
 "Boxcars" (Butch Hancock) – 4:03 
 "Jericho (Your Walls Must Come Tumbling Down)" (Butch Hancock) – 2:54 
 "Tonight I Think I'm Gonna Go Downtown" (Jimmie Dale Gilmore, John Reed) – 2:12

Side two
 "Honky Tonk Masquerade" – 3:46 
 "I'll Be Your Fool" – 2:52 
 "Fingernails" – 2:13 
 "West Texas Waltz" (Butch Hancock) – 5:03 
 "Honky Tonkin'" (Hank Williams) – 3:27

Personnel 
Credits as listed in liner notes.

Musicians
 Joe Ely - vocals, acoustic guitar 
 Lloyd Maines - steel guitar
 Steve Keeton - drums
 Gregg Wright - bass 
 Ponty Bone - accordion, piano 
 Jesse Taylor - acoustic and electric guitar
 Chip Young - acoustic and electric guitar
 John Goldthwaite - electric guitar
 Shane Keister - Moog synthesizer, acoustic piano 
 Farrell Morris - percussion
 Lea Jane Berinati, Ginger Holloday, Lisa Silver, Jesse Taylor, Lloyd Maines, Gregg Wright - backing vocals
 Butch Hancock – background vocals on "West Texas Waltz"

Production 
 Produced by Chip Young
 Recorded/remixed: Youngun' Sounds Studios, Murfreesboro, Tennessee
 Engineer – Chip Young
 Mastering Studio: MCA Recording Studios, Universal City, California
 Mastering Engineer – Larry Boden
 Digitally re-mastered at Masterfonics using the JVC Digital Audio Mastering System
 Engineer – Glenn Meadows

Artwork 
 Cover photo – Paul Milosevich

Releases 
In 2000, a remastered edition of Ely's first two albums (Joe Ely and Honky Tonk Masquerade) were released together on a single disk.  Dirty Linen reported that this disk was especially worth seeking out since it was (at least at the time), "the only place on two continents you can get Ely's debut".  The reviewer described Ely's first two albums together: "Ely's self-titled effort and HTM are a bit leaner than most of his other honky-tonk rockers, with a bit more piano than electric guitar backing his lonesome warble – dry and forceful as the wind whistling through Waco."

Notes and sources

Notes

References

1978 albums
Joe Ely albums
MCA Records albums